Dr. Manuel Martínez Maldonado (born 1937), MD; MACP, an internist and nephrologist, administrator, educator, poet and author, has authored numerous scientific publications and edited several books. His research interests are the regulation of body fluids and the pathophysiology of blood pressure and its effects on the kidneys. He also focuses on the renin angiotensin system, a hormone system that helps regulate long-term blood pressure and blood volume in the body and which is controlled primarily by the kidneys. His clinical research has included polycycstic kidney disease, renal stones and hypercalcemia. Martinez-Maldonado has occupied numerous positions, including Vice President for Research at Oregon Health and Sciences University (1998-2000), President and Dean of the Ponce School of Medicine (2000–2006). He was the executive vice president for research at the University of Louisville from 2000 to 2009.

Early years
Martínez Maldonado, born in the southern town of Yauco, Puerto Rico, was an only child. He received his primary education in Holy Rosary School in Yauco, St Joseph School in San Germán and Holy Spirit School in Hato Rey. His secondary education took place in the Matienzo Cintron School in Santurce and the JJ Osuna School in Hato Rey. He attended the University High School and was the president of the graduating class in 1954. After graduating from high school, he entered the University of Puerto Rico, where he studied chemistry and literature. In his sophomore year, Martínez Maldonado decided that he would like to study medicine instead of literature. He graduated magna cum laude and was accepted at Temple University School of Medicine (TUSM), in Philadelphia, Pennsylvania where he earned his medical degree. After residency in internal medicine at the San Juan Veterans Administration Hospital and University Hospital, he completed his postdoctoral study on renal and electrolyte metabolism at the Southwestern Medical School of the University of Texas.

Martínez Maldonado became interested in the field of renal physiology and, later on, in nephrology, and was accepted by the Dallas Southwestern Nephrology Division, where he became an investigator and carried out many of his initial experiments. He became an independent investigator at Baylor College of Medicine in Houston where he rose from an assistant to a full professor of medicine with tenure (1968–1973). Nephrology is a branch of internal medicine and pediatrics dealing with the study of the function and diseases of the kidney.

Scientific investigations
Martínez Maldonado perfected a technique that could measure the osmolality of samples (nanoliters) of proximal tubar fluids. He and his colleagues at Baylor designed a clinical treatment for hypercalcemia that was in use until the beginning of this century when specific medications were developed for the condition.

In 1973, Martínez Maldonado ended his professorship at Baylor University to become Associate Chief of Staff for Research at the San Juan Veterans Administration Medical Center, and professor and Chair of the Department of Physiology, and Professor of Medicine at the University of Puerto Rico School of Medicine. During his time at Baylor College of Medicine he published 39 original investigations in various journals such as the Journal of Clinical Investigation, the New England Journal of Medicine and the American Journal of Physiology.. This scholarly activity continued in his Renal Metabolic Laboratory at the San Juan VA and the department of Physiology. He rescued the department of physiology by recruiting new faculty staff and sending students to train in important physiology departments in the United States and recruiting them back to the island. He is credited for the development of an outstanding training program for internal medicine at the San Juan VA and responsible for the identification of talent among his students. Many of those occupy important positions in academic medicine and clinical practice in Puerto Rico and the United States.

Written works
Martínez Maldonado, who is married with four children, published five books of poetry and two novels.

In addition he was editor or co-editor of several books such as:

 Methods in Pharmacology, vol. IVA, Renal Pharmacology. New York: Plenum Publishing, 1976.
 Co-editor with N. Kurtzman. Renal Pathophysiology. Springfield, IL: Charles C. Thomas, 1976.
 Editor, Methods in Pharmacology, IVB, Renal Pharmacology. New York: Plenum, 1978.
 Co-editor with J.L. Rodicio Diaz. Tratado de Nefrologia. Barcelona, Spain: Editorial Salvat, 1982.
 Editor. Handbook of Renal Therapeutics. New York: Plenum, March 1983.
 Co-editor with G. Eknoyan. The Physiological Basis of Diuretic Therapy in Clinical Medicine. New York: Grune & Stratton, 1986.
 Co-editor with J.F. Macias-Nuñez. Hipertension en Geriatria. Madrid: Jarpyo Editores, 1989.
 Editor, Renal Disease and Hypertension in the Elderly. Boston: Blackwell Scientific, 1992.
 Co-editor with J. Rodicio and J. Herrera Acosta. Tratado de Nefrologia (Treatise on Nephrology). Madrid: Ediciones Norma, 1993.

Poetry
"La voz sostenida" (1984)
"Palm Beach Blues" (1986)
"Por amor al arte" (1989)
"Hotel María" (1999)
"Novela de Mediodia (2003)
"Breve es el amor, Editorial Gaviota, (2019)

Novel
"Isla Verde" (El Chevy Azul)1999, Verbum, Madrid
"El Vuelo del Dragon" 2012, Terranova, San Juan, Puerto Rico
"Del color de la muerte" 2014 Publicaciones Gaviota, Río Piedras, Puerto Rico
"El Imperialista Ausente" National Novel Award of the Puerto Rican Institute of Culture, 2013
"Solo la muerte tiene permanencia", Verbum, Madrid, 2015
"El descubrimiento", Editorial Gaviota, 2019
"Ausencia", Editorial Gaviota, 2021

Legacy
Martínez Maldonado was elected to the American Society of Clinical Investigations. He is a member of the Association of American Physicians; the Institute of Medicine of the National Academy of Sciences, now the National Academy of Medicine; the American Academy of Arts and Sciences, and a fellow of the American Association for the Advancement of Science. He was also a member of the American Board of Internal Medicine, Nephrology panel, and a Master of the American College of Physicians.

He belonged to numerous boards of editors and was Chief Editor of The American Journal of the Medical Sciences (1994–98).

He is listed in Who's Who in America and Who's Who in the World. He presided over the Southern Society for Clinical Investigation and the Latin American Society of Nephrology and Hypertension.

In 1975, in addition to being Professor of Medicine and Physiology at the University of Puerto Rico, he was appointed Chief of Medical Services at the San Juan Veterans Administration Medical Center. In 1991, he was awarded the Founders Medal of the Southern Society for Clinical Investigations. In 1990 he was appointed Chief of the Medical Services at the Atlanta VA Center, Professor and Vice Chair of the Department of Medicine at Emory University. He moved to OHSU in Portland, Oregon where he was instrumental in the creation of the Vaccine and Gene Therapy Center of that institution.  In 2000, Martínez Maldonado was named president and dean of the Ponce School of Medicine. He obtained full accreditation for the school and improved its finances and, in 2006, he was selected as the executive vice president for research at the University of Louisville. where he saw through the building and completion, and the recruitment of the director of the Center for Predictive Medicine, one of thirteen level-3 biodefense laboratories in the United States.

See also

List of Puerto Ricans
Puerto Rican scientists and inventors

References

1937 births
Living people
Baylor University faculty
People from Yauco, Puerto Rico
Puerto Rican scientists
Puerto Rican nephrologists
Puerto Rican educators
Puerto Rican poets
Puerto Rican male writers
University of Puerto Rico faculty
Temple University School of Medicine alumni
Members of the National Academy of Medicine